The 1911–12 SK Rapid Wien season was the 14th season in club history.

Squad

Squad and statistics

Squad statistics

Fixtures and results

League

References

1911-12 Rapid Wien Season
Rapid
Austrian football championship-winning seasons